Jaświły  is a village in Mońki County, Podlaskie Voivodeship, in north-eastern Poland. It is the seat of the gmina (administrative district) called Gmina Jaświły.

References

Villages in Mońki County
Belostoksky Uyezd
Białystok Voivodeship (1919–1939)
Belastok Region